Alonzo Jackson (born September 15, 1980) is a former American football defensive end. He previously played for the Pittsburgh Steelers, New York Giants, and the Philadelphia Eagles.

High school career 
A native of Americus, Georgia, Jackson attended Americus High School, where he was a standout defensive lineman. As a senior, he recorded 116 tackles, 16 sacks, and three blocked kicks, and was a first-team Class 2A all-state selection. Recruiting analyst Tom Lemming rated Jackson as the No. 110 player in the Southeast. He chose Florida State over Georgia and Florida.

College career 
In his true freshman season with Seminoles, Jackson played in all 12 games and was credited with 13 total tackles, three solo tackles and one pass break-up. In the National Championship game, the Sugar Bowl vs. Virginia Tech, Jackson contributed one solo tackle on special teams. As a sophomore, Jackson played in all 12 games (including four starts), serving primarily as back-up to senior David Warren at defensive end. He finished with 37 tackles (including 16 unassisted) on the season, and ranked fourth on the team with 5.0 quarterback sacks, behind Jamal Reynolds (12.0), David Warren (9.0), and Darnell Dockett (7.0). Jackson's season-best game came against Virginia, when he recorded six tackles, two tackles for loss, and one sack.

After Warren's graduation, Jackson took over the left defensive end spot, starting ten games. He missed the Miami (FL) and Virginia games with a sprained knee. Jackson led the team with five quarterback sacks and ranked second with 16 hurries. He also had eight tackles for loss, which tied Travis Johnson for second on the team, behind Darnell Dockett who posted a school-record 22 TFLs. Jackson finished the season with 33 total tackles (19 solo) and named honorable mention All-ACC. He had five tackles and two tackles for loss in the Gator Bowl against Virginia Tech.

In his senior year, Jackson started all 14 games of the season, and registered team-highs in tackles for loss (18.5), sacks (13.0), and quarterback hurries (19). He also had 42 tackles (34 unassisted, sixth on the team), and forced four fumbles (team-high). Against Iowa State, he caught his only interception of the season, and returned it for 48 yards into the endzone.

Professional career 

Due to disappointing performances of Andre Wadsworth and Jamal Reynolds, the potential of “undersized Seminole ends” like Jackson was met with scepticism. The Pittsburgh Steelers drafted him in the second round of the 2003 NFL Draft and he made the transition from defensive end to left outside linebacker in the 3–4 defense, projected as a long-term replacement for veteran Jason Gildon.  He performed well during the preseason in both of his years with the Steelers, but only saw playing time on special teams.  He was cut prior to the 2005 season, and later signed with the New York Giants and the Philadelphia Eagles.

References

External links 
Florida State Seminoles bio

1980 births
American football defensive ends
American football linebackers
Living people
New York Giants players
Philadelphia Eagles players
Pittsburgh Steelers players
People from Americus, Georgia
Players of American football from Georgia (U.S. state)